Carl Madison Cunningham (born July 23, 1944) is a former professional American football linebacker who played five seasons in the National Football League (NFL) for the Denver Broncos and New Orleans Saints.

Cunningham was a fourth-round draft pick for Denver in 1967.

References

1944 births
Living people
Players of American football from Houston
American football linebackers
Houston Cougars football players
Denver Broncos (AFL) players
Denver Broncos players
New Orleans Saints players